This is a list of semiregular variable stars.  Variability ranges are taken from the General Catalogue of Variable Stars (GCVS) where these are visual magnitudes, otherwise from the International Variable Star Index (VSX).  Spectral types are taken from the GCVS, which may differ from more recent MK spectral types but often defines a range.

See also
 Lists of astronomical objects
 Lists of stars
 List of stars that have unusual dimming periods
 Variable star designation

Variable, semiregular
 list